Congress established the Northeast Corridor Commission (the Commission) under Sec. 212 of Public Law 110-432 (Passenger Rail Investment and Improvement Act of 2008)  to promote mutual cooperation and planning among owners and operators on the Northeast Corridor (NEC) rail line and to advise the U.S. Congress on Corridor policy and investment needs.

Description
The Commission consists of one member from each of the NEC states and the District of Columbia; four members from Amtrak; and five members from the U.S. Department of Transportation. The Commission also includes non-voting representatives from four freight railroads, states with feeder corridors, and commuter authorities not directly represented by a Commission member.

The Commission approved a Northeast Corridor Commuter and Intercity Rail Cost Allocation Policy (the Policy) in 2015 as a first step towards establishing a new framework for regional cooperation. The Policy employs consistent and transparent methods for sharing about $1 billion in annual operating and baseline capital costs among infrastructure owners and service operators. In addition, the Policy calls for a collaborative capital planning process among stakeholders, new performance reporting requirements, and a federal-state funding partnership to eliminate the $28 billion state-of-good repair backlog and address improvement needs not funded through the Policy.

Congressional passage of the FAST Act in December 2015 represented a significant step forward for the NEC.  It marked the first time that intercity passenger rail was addressed in a multi-year authorization alongside other surface transportation programs and it codified many of recommendations included in the Policy aimed at increasing collaboration, transparency, and accountability for all NEC stakeholders.

Members 
The NEC Commission has five voting members from USDOT, four from Amtrak, and one each from the eight NEC states and the District of Columbia. Non-voting members include the NEC feeder states, freight railroads and independent commuter authorities.

NEC States:
Massachusetts Department of Transportation
Rhode Island Department of Transportation
Connecticut Department of Transportation 
New York State Department of Transportation
NJ Transit
Pennsylvania Department of Transportation
Delaware Department of Transportation
Maryland Department of Transportation
District of Columbia Department of Transportation

U.S. Department of Transportation:
5 members, including:
Federal Railroad Administration
Federal Transit Administration

Amtrak:
4 members

Non-voting Representatives 
Conrail Shared Assets Operations
CSX Transportation
Norfolk Southern Corporation
Providence and Worcester Railroad
Massachusetts Bay Transportation Authority
New Hampshire
New York Metropolitan Transportation Authority
Northern New England Passenger Rail Authority
North Carolina Department of Transportation
Southeastern Pennsylvania Transportation Authority
Vermont Agency of Transportation
Virginia Department of Transportation

References

External links 

Northeastern United States
Northeast Corridor
Independent agencies of the United States government